Besim Üstünel (1927 – June 2, 2015) was an academic in economics, politician and former Minister of Finance of Turkey.

Family life and early years
Besim Üstünel was born to Emin Üstünel and his wife Zekiye in  Gaziantep, Southeastern Turkey in 1927. He had four sisters Nermin, Saadet, Sema, Aysen and four brothers Rasim Daşar, Mesut, Gündüz, Erol.

After his primary and secondary education in his home city, Üstünel graduated from the School of Economics at Istanbul University in 1946. After doctorate studies in the same university, he completed his post graduate studies in London School of Economics.

He was married to Gülen Üstünel, born Cin.

Career
Besim Üstünel pursued a teaching career, and taught in the Faculty of Political Science, Ankara University. During this period, he served as a visiting professor in the universities of Stockholm and Minnesota. Üstünel served also in the State planning Organization of Turkey.

In 1965, he was appointed deputy secretary general of the Republican People's Party (CHP) upon request of the party leader İsmet İnönü. However, he did not enter the parliament for active politics. In the 1975 Turkish senate elections, he became a CHP senator serving until the 1980 Turkish coup d'état. Between June 21 and July 21, 1977, he served as the Minister of Finance in the 40th government of Turkey (2nd Bülent Ecevit government), which failed to receive the vote of confidence.

After the 1980 military coup, he returned to academic studies, and taught in the Istanbul Technical University and later at Marmara University and Galatasaray University. In 1986 he served in Seijo University in Tokyo as a visiting professor. He also served as the speaker of Turkish delegation in Council of Europe between 1980-1981.

Death
Üstünel died in Istanbul Florence Nightingale Hospital on June 2, 2015. Following the religious ceremony at Teşvikiye Mosque, he was interred in Ulus Cemetery on June 4, 2015.

Works

References

1927 births
People from Gaziantep
Istanbul University alumni
Alumni of the London School of Economics
Turkish economists
Academic staff of Ankara University
Academic staff of Istanbul Technical University
Academic staff of Marmara University
Academic staff of Galatasaray University
Republican People's Party (Turkey) politicians
Members of the Senate of the Republic (Turkey)
Ministers of Finance of Turkey
Council of Europe people
2015 deaths
Members of the 40th government of Turkey